Metal Mulisha is an American lifestyle clothing brand that was created in 1997 by Larry Linkogle and Brian Deegan.  Metal Mulisha Inc. products are sold at various retail stores and company owned stores. It also offers Metal Mulisha energy drinks under the same brand in a joint venture with Rockstar. The company currently employs about 450 people. The Metal Mulisha Monster Jam Monster truck debuted in 2012 at Reliant Stadium in Houston, Texas.

Clothing
Formed in Bridgewater, Massachusetts, Metal Mulisha T-shirts were fashionable among youth in the 2000s. The shirts often feature existential slogans or quotes that tout the virtues of extreme sports.

In 2010, the Murrieta Valley Unified School District banned Metal Mulisha clothing at its schools, due to graphics resembling Nazi symbols and iconography.  Some graphics appearing on Metal Mulisha's clothing line include a skull wearing a helmet resembling one worn by German soldiers in World War II, while on the company's logo, the "S" in "Mulisha" is represented graphically by a lightning bolt that resembles the double lightning bolts insignia  of the Nazi major paramilitary organization Schutzstaffel, LAB or SS.

Rabbi Barry Ulrych, of the B'nai Chaim of Murrieta synagogue, regarding the images appearing on Metal Mulisha products, stated "People say it's just a fashion—it's more than that—it's an identity. These symbols are not as neutral as one might think. Symbols can hurt, and some symbols are intimidating. With this symbolism, they are glorifying the Nazi past. You can't go through life being ignorant of symbols."

In a letter, the company countered with the statement "Metal Mulisha founders and riders are devout Christians, espousing those values prized in the religious community."

References

External links
 

1990s fashion
Clothing brands of the United States
Clothing companies established in 1997
Companies based in Carlsbad, California
Freestyle motocross
Monster trucks
Privately held companies based in California
Sportswear brands